The National Psychological Association for Psychoanalysis (NPAP) is an institution established in New York City by Theodore Reik in 1948, in response to the controversy over lay analysis and the question of the training of psychoanalysts in the United States.

Following the lead established by Sigmund Freud, the NPAP offers training to the three core disciplines of medicine, social work, and psychology, as well as to graduates from the humanities.

History
Over the following decades, inevitably dissensions emerged in the organization, and other non-medical training institutions were set up in the United States.

Ideology
The organization sees itself as a vibrant professional association of analysts representing a diversity of theories that comprise contemporary psychoanalytic inquiry. The NPAP's diverse membership is active in research, publication, legislation, public education, and cultural affairs, thus ensuring a psychoanalytic contribution to the community at large. The NPAP also publishes the journal The Psychoanalytic Review, the oldest continuously published psychoanalytic journal in the United States.

Mindful of a legacy reaching directly back to Freud, the Institute today offers comprehensive psychoanalytic training grounded in the classical tradition, expanded by contemporary insights, and designed to prepare candidates for the professional practice of psychoanalysis.

References

External links
 Splits in Psychoanalysis

Psychoanalysis organizations
1948 establishments in the United States
Scientific organizations established in 1948
Organizations based in New York City
Psychoanalysis in the United States